Râmnicu may refer to several places in Romania:

 Râmnicu Vâlcea, the capital city of Vâlcea County 
 Râmnicu Sărat, a city in Buzău County 
 Râmnicu de Jos and Râmnicu de Sus, villages in Cogealac Commune, Constanța County

and to:
 Râmnic, a river in Tulcea and Constanța Counties
 Râmnicul Sărat, a river in Vrancea, Buzău, and Galați Counties